The diocese of Đà Nẵng is a Roman Catholic diocese in central Vietnam. The bishop is Joseph Đặng Đức Ngân since 2016. The creation of the diocese in present form was declared January 18, 1963. The diocese covers an area of 11,690 km², and is a suffragan diocese of the Archdiocese of Huế. By 2004, the diocese of Đà Nang had about 57,870 believers (2.7% of the population), 68 priests and 38 parishes. Sacred Heart Cathedral in Da Nang has been assigned as the Cathedral of the diocese.

Bishops
 Pierre Marie Pham-Ngoc-Chi (January 18, 1963 - January 21, 1988)
 François Xavier Nguyên Quang Sách (January 21, 1988 - November 6, 2000)
 Paul Nguyên Binh Tinh, P.S.S. (November 6, 2000 - May 13, 2006)
 Joseph Chau Ngoc Tri (May 13, 2006 - March 12, 2016), appointed Bishop of Lạng Sơn and Cao Bằng
 Joseph Đặng Đức Ngân (since March 12, 2016)

References

Da Nang
Da Nang
Christian organizations established in 1963
Roman Catholic dioceses and prelatures established in the 20th century
Da Nang, Roman Catholic Diocese of